Shorter House is a classical sheet music publisher, founded in 2010, specializing in choral church music. According to the Music Publishers Association (UK) it also publishes: choral/vocal, early music and ballet. 

Shorter House is based in London, UK, and has a distribution agreement in the United States and Canada with the established music publisher Edition Peters.

References

Publishing companies established in 2010
Publishing companies based in London